Escape Velocity is a BBC Books original novel written by Colin Brake and based on the long-running British science fiction television series Doctor Who. It features the Eighth Doctor and Fitz and introduces the new companion of Anji Kapoor. This book completes the story arc in which the Doctor was trapped on Earth for a hundred years.

Plot

In 2001, there is a new space race, between Pierre Yves-Dudoin and Arthur Tyler III, both competing to be the first privately funded man in space. Eventually Pierre announces that he has succeeded, and will be in space in a week. However, Pierre has been helped by a scout of the Kulan race, who are poised to invade Earth.

In Brussels a man is shot in front of stockbroker Anji Kapoor and her boyfriend Dave. When Dave attempts first aid, he realises the man is not human. The man then slips a package into Dave's pocket and injects a substance into his wrist. Meanwhile, in London, Fitz is dropped off by Compassion two days before he is to meet the Doctor. When he sees Dave in a news report claiming the dead man had two hearts, he fears the worst and travels to Brussels.

After speaking to Dave in Brussels, Fitz discovers that the man wasn't the Doctor, but stays to help investigate. Dave finds the package in his pocket and calls a number written on it, and finds himself speaking to Arthur Tyler III. After meeting Tyler's bodyguard, they bring him back to Dave and Anji's hotel room only to find the killers outside. As the killers drive away, one of them drops his gun which is of alien origin. When Dave leaves the room to contact the police, the dead man's killers kidnap him. Anji then decides to go with Fitz to meet the Doctor.

On 8 February, Anji and Fitz arrive at St. Louis' pub to meet the Doctor. The Doctor reveals that he created the pub to lure Fitz to him. When the Doctor sees Fitz, he still cannot remember any of his past, and his TARDIS is still smaller on the inside than the outside. Despite this, the Doctor agrees to help and sends Fitz back to Brussels to investigate if Pierre is involved, whilst the Doctor and Anji will stay in London to investigate Tyler.

In Brussels Fitz meets a CIA agent called Fisher who is investigating whether Pierre Dudoin's company, ITI, has been in contact with aliens. Together they break into the ITI headquarters and find an alien called Sa'Motta tending to Dave. Sa'Motta explains that he came to Earth in a failed invasion spearhead four years ago and has been stranded which prevents him from stopping their leader, Fray'kon, from reporting that Earth should be invaded by the Kulans. Fray'kon has been helping Dubion's ship near completion to rejoin the invasion fleet. The other Kulans in the spearhead just want to return home and have been helping Tyler's ship. However Kulan ships need telepathy to work, so research has been done to produce a hybrid who can work the ship. The dead man had been giving the genes necessary to Tyler, but injected them into Dave to preserve them. However, the genes injected into Dave are slowly killing him. As guards recapture Dave, Fisher's boss orders a squad to capture Fitz and Sa'Motta.

Meanwhile, the Doctor and Anji go to Tyler's base and save his life after a Kulan computer virus planted by Dudoin traps Tyler in a room with a fire. The Doctor puts the virus on a DVD for study. The Doctor offers to help stop Dudoin and Fray'kon's plan, but Tyler's ship is destroyed by an after-effect of the virus. Tyler turns to his former friend and Dudoin's ex-wife Christine Holland to help with adapting the Kulan technology for humans, but before he can contact her, Dudoin kidnaps his daughter Pippa to force her to come to Brussels to help Dave. She does so, but Dudoin reveals he plans to launch the rocket without testing it. Christine sees Fray'kon tamper with the controls, but Dudoin refuses to listen.

Fitz and Sa'Motta attempt to go to London, but realise they are followed by CIA agents. Fitz is captured and taken to the CIA's agent known as Control, but Sa'Motta escapes, and makes the way to the CIA base where Fitz is being held. Control puts a tracer on Fitz and allows Sa'Motta to rescue him to lead the CIA to the other Kulan. While escaping, Fitz realises that his memories of the destruction of Gallifrey are getting blurred and hazy. In space, the invasion fleet moves into its final formation, ready to invade on Fray'kon's command.

Meanwhile, the Doctor rescues Christine's daughter and asks for Tyler's help in stopping Dudoin and Fray'kon getting to space and alerting the invasion fleet, which he agrees to. The Doctor, Tyler, and Anji break into Dudoin's launch pad with ease as Fitz and Sa'Motta are being chased by guards elsewhere in the complex. After rescuing Christine, the Doctor links his mind to Dudoin's ship to shut it down, but he passes out in the process. However, he first raises the oxygen level which causes the Kulan led by Fray'kon to faint, but Fray'kon escapes. Tyler then uses the DVD with the Kulan virus to destroy the systems, and the cabin sets alight, killing the Kulan aboard and Dudoin himself.

Returning to Britain, the Doctor helps Tyler complete his rocket so he can return Sa'Motta to the invasion fleet to order the abortion of the invasion. Dave is recovering, but Christine discovers a small amount of Kulan DNA in Dave which was there before his infection, indicating that humans and Kulan may be genetically related, giving solid evidence against the invasion. However Fray'kon enters, having followed them.

Control's squad enters, to stop Tyler's ship taking Sa'Motta to the fleet, but Tyler attempts to launch anyway. Fray'kon steals the Doctor's spacesuit and forces Dave to drive to the launch platform, whilst holding Anji hostage. After reaching the rocket, he murders Dave and boards the rocket. The CIA withdraw from the complex, but the Doctor can't warn Tyler about Fray'kon being on board the rocket. Fray'kon overpowers the crew and drives the rocket towards the fleet, where he informs the fleet commander that the humans are savages, and should be killed.

The Doctor and Anji go back to St Louis' pub, where the TARDIS has finally regenerated itself. The Doctor pilots the TARDIS onto the Kulan command ship. The Doctor tells Anji to stay in the TARDIS, but she follows him and watches him be captured and put in a holding cell. The Kulan destroy Tyler's ship and put him on trial in front of their war council. Anji releases Fitz and they go to the weapons room. Trying to scare the Kulan by firing an energy beam, she instead fires a barrage of missiles which destroy half the fleet, who turn on each other. The Doctor and Tyler fight Fray'kon, but when Fray'kon gets stunned, Tyler offers to stay and hold off Fray'kon whilst the others escape. Tyler tricks Fray'kon into falling to an airlock and Tyler ejects himself and Fray'kon into space. As the remainder of the fleet blows up as the TARDIS dematerialises. The Doctor, who still cannot remember anything, offers to take Anji home, but the TARDIS materialises onto a prehistoric landscape instead.

Continuity
The character of Control, the head of a secret division within the Central Intelligence Agency that investigates paranormal activity, appears in this novel. He also appears in The Devil Goblins from Neptune, The King of Terror and Time Zero. It is implied he may have a connection to the Celestial Intervention Agency.
The Doctor suggests he may be an exile from the 49th century, a reference to the first, unbroadcast version of the pilot episode, An Unearthly Child.
It is implied that the Doctor's memories remain in his mind, albeit suppressed, as he remembers the appearances of the First Doctor and the Second Doctor in a passing comment to Anji.

Reception 

Escape Velocity won Worst Book in the 2001 Jade Pagoda Awards.

References

External links
The Cloister Library – Escape Velocity

2001 British novels
2001 science fiction novels
Eighth Doctor Adventures
Novels by Colin Brake
Fiction about amnesia